Karkaraq is a village in Kalkharan Rural District, in the Central District of Ardabil County, Ardabil Province, Iran. At the 2006 census, its population was 1,393, in 308 families.

References 

Towns and villages in Ardabil County